Carenum opacicolle is a species of ground beetle in the subfamily Scaritinae. It was described by Sloane in 1897.

References

opacicolle
Beetles described in 1897